Logan Phillips (born December 15, 1982) is an American politician and teacher who served in the Oklahoma House of Representatives from the 24th district from 2018 to 2022.

Early life and education 
Logan Phillips was born on December 15, 1982, in Tulsa, Oklahoma. He attended Tulsa Community College where he earned an associate degree in business administration followed by a B.S. in Business and information technology from Oklahoma State, and a Masters Degree in Teaching learning and leadership from Oklahoma State University.

Career 
From 2000 to 2006 Phillips served in the United States Army.
Prior to running for office, Phillips worked as an Assistant Professor of Business and Information Technology at Tulsa Community College.

Oklahoma House of Representatives 
During his time in the Oklahoma house of representatives Logan Phillips has served as the Chairman of the House Technology Committee and co-Chairman of the Rural Broadband Expansion Council, and chairman of Technology and Chairman of ARPA working group on Infrastructure and Broadband.

Campaigns
Phillips filed to run for office in Oklahoma's 24th house district after participating in the 2018 Oklahoma teacher protests. He spent no money on his first run for office and unseated the Democratic House Minority leader Steve Kouplen in the November 2018 general election. Political analysts attributed the win to the nationalization of local politics and the prevalence of straight-ticket voting in the district, where 48% of Phillips's voters had marked "Republican" on the straight-party voting option. The race was considered part of a trend of eastern Oklahoma voters shifting more Republican.

In 2020, Phillips again faced Steve Kouplen in the general election, along with new opponents Sam Stamper, John Baca, and Elijah Harelson in the republican primary.

Phillips's house district was drastically redrawn in 2022 and he faced two primary challengers from Bixby, Chris Banning and Bobby Schultz. During the primary the political action committee School Freedom Fund Oklahoma spent over $90,000 in a campaign against Phillips.
He lost his reelection campaign in the June primary to Chris Banning.

References

Further reading
Top priorities come into focus as Oklahoma lawmakers gather for legislative session
Two GOP Oklahoma lawmakers push for 'magic mushroom' research
Bill would provide state funds for students in private schools
Legislation to crack down on robocalls and scams under consideration
News Watch Oklahoma with Scott Mitchell (Nov. 17, 2021)
Oklahoma lawmakers join LOCAL coalition on visit to grocery store utilizing “Double Up Oklahoma” program
Republican lawmakers call for Governor Stitt to grant clemency for death row inmate Julius Jones one week before schedule execution
First ARPA funds go to broadband mapping, youth mental health care
https://www.oklahoman.com/story/news/2021/12/05/infrastructure-bill-seen-game-changer-rural-oklahoma-bridges-broadband/8808438002/
Stitt vetoes bills on broadband council, agency fees, abstractors and vision screening
Oklahoma House Republicans Encourage Arizona Lawmakers to Interfere in 2020 Election
Oklahoma lawmakers override six Stitt vetoes including rural broadband bill
Home delivery included in medical marijuana bills advanced by House committee
5 GOP lawmakers urge governor to spare Julius Jones' life
Oklahoma is getting $2 billion in COVID-19 relief funds. How should it be spent?

1982 births
Living people
Republican Party members of the Oklahoma House of Representatives
21st-century American politicians